Delap-Uliga-Djarrit (DUD) is the capital and the largest city of the Marshall Islands with 20,301 people (2012 census). The town is located in Majuro Atoll.

History 
Majuro Atoll was claimed by the German Empire with the rest of the Marshall Islands in 1884, and the Germans established a trading outpost. As with the rest of the Marshalls, Majuro was captured by the Imperial Japanese Navy in 1914 during World War I and mandated to the Empire of Japan by the League of Nations in 1920. The island then became a part of the Japanese mandated territory of the South Seas Mandate; although the Japanese had established a government in the mandate, local affairs were mostly left in the hands of traditional local leaders until the start of World War II.

On January 30, 1944, United States troops invaded and built a large base, Naval Base Majuro. In 1986, Marshall Islands become an independent nation and Delap-Uliga-Djarrit became the country's capital.

Demographics 
In 2012, the population of Delap-Uliga-Djarrit was 20,301.

Famous places 
Alele Museum is located in Delap-Uliga-Djarrit. The Cathedral of the Assumption of the Roman Catholic Apostolic Prefecture of the Marshall Islands and Baet-Ul-Ahad Mosque are located in town center.

Economy 
On September 15, 2007, Witon Barry, of the Tobolar Copra processing plant in the Marshall Islands' capital of Majuro, said power authorities, private companies and entrepreneurs had been experimenting with coconut oil as an alternative to diesel fuel for vehicles, power generators and ships. Coconut trees abound in the Pacific's tropical islands. Copra from 6 to 10 coconuts makes 1 litre of oil.

The town has a port, shopping district, hotels, and an international airport.

Education 

Located in Delap-Uliga-Djarrit are the College of the Marshall Islands, Assumption High School, and Uliga Elementary School. English is taught to all students.

The Marshall Islands High School is near the north end of the town.

The University of South Pacific has a presence on Delap-Uliga-Djarrit.

Delap-Uliga-Djarrit has the Seventh Day Adventist High School and Elementary School where English is taught to all students.

Health
The town has a hospital with 81 beds. It is the main hospital for Delap-Uliga-Djarrit, as well as many of the outer islands.

References

Capitals in Oceania
Majuro
Populated places in the Marshall Islands